Approximate measures are units of volumetric measurement which are not defined by a government or government-sanctioned organization, or which were previously defined and are now repealed, yet which remain in use.

It may be that all English-unit derived capacity measurements are derived from one original approximate measurement: the mouthful, consisting of about  ounce, called the ro in ancient Egypt (their smallest recognized unit of capacity). The mouthful was still a unit of liquid measure during Elizabethan times. (The principal Egyptian standards from small to large were the ro, hin, hekat, and khar.)

Because of the lack of official definitions, many of these units will not have a consistent value.

United Kingdom
glass-tumbler
breakfast-cup
tea-cup
wine-glass
table-spoon
dessert-spoon
tea-spoon
black-jack
demijohn (dame-jeanne)
goblet
pitcher
gyllot (about equal to 1/2 gill)
noggin (1/4 pint)
nipperkin (measure for liquor, containing no more than 1/2 pint)
tumblerful (10 fl oz or 2 gills or 2 teacupsful)
apothecaries' approximate measures
teacupful = about 4 fl oz
wineglassful = about 2 fl oz
tablespoonful = about 1/2 fl oz
dessertspoonful = about 2 fl dr
teaspoonful = about 1 fl dr
drop = about minim
teacupful (5 fl oz, or 1 gill ibid)
wineglassful (2-1/2 fl oz or 1/2 gill or 1/2 teacupful or 1/4 tumblerful)
dessertspoonful (1/4 fl oz or 2 fl dr and equal to 2 teaspoonful or 1/2 tablespoonful)
teaspoonful (1/8 fl oz or 1 fl dr and also equal to 1/2 dessertspoonful or 1/4 tablespoonful)

United States
The vagueness of how these measures have been defined, redefined, and undefined over the years, both through written and oral history, is best exemplified by the large number of sources that need to be read and cross-referenced in order to paint even a reasonably accurate picture. So far, the list includes the United States Pharmacopoeia, U.S. FDA, NIST, A Manual of Weights, Measures, and Specific Gravity, State Board Questions and Answers,  MediCalc, MacKenzie's Ten Thousand Receipts, Approximate Practical Equivalents,  When is a Cup not a Cup?, Cook's Info, knitting-and.com., and Modern American Drinks.

Dashes, pinches, and smidgens are all traditionally very small amounts well under a teaspoon, but not more uniformly defined.  In the early 2000s some companies began selling measuring spoons that defined a dash as  teaspoon, a pinch as  teaspoon, and a smidgen as  teaspoon. Based on these spoons, there are two smidgens in a pinch and two pinches in a dash. However, the 1954 Angostura “Professional Mixing Guide” states that “a dash” is 1/6th of a teaspoon, or 1/48 of an ounce, and Victor Bergeron (a.k.a. Trader Vic, famous saloonkeeper), said that for bitters it was  teaspoon, but  fl oz for all other liquids.

References

Measurement